Vangaindrano is a district of Atsimo-Atsinanana in Madagascar.

Communes
The district is further divided into 28 communes:

 Ambatolava
 Ambongo
 Amparihy Est
 Ampasimalemy
 Ampataka
 Anilobe
 Bekaraoka
 Bevata
 Fenoambany
 Iara
 Isahara
 Karimbary
 Lohafary
 Lopary
 Manambondro
 Marokibo
 Masianaka
 Matanga
 Ranomena
 Sandravinany
 Soamanova
 Tsianofana
 Tsiately
 Vangaindrano
 Vatanato
 Vohimalaza
 Vohipaho
 Vohitrambo

Geography
Vangaindrano is near the mouth of the Mananara River at the southern part of the east coast.

Roads
It's connected to the north by National Road RN 12 to Farafangana that is situated at a distance of 75 km in the North. The road continues south as National Road 12a to Fort Dauphin but this section can hardly be by ordinary vehicles, due to its bad condition and lack of bridges..

RN T18 to Nosifeno and the Midongy du sud National Park.

Nature
The Midongy Atsimo National Park is situated at 90 km from Vangaindrano and the Manombo Reserve, halfway to Farafangana.

References 

Districts of Atsimo-Atsinanana